Armenia competed at the 2014 Winter Olympics in Sochi, Russia from 7 to 23 February 2014. The team consists of four athletes competing in two sports. Both male cross-country skiers qualified for their events, while the other two athletes received wildcards.

Alpine skiing 

According to the quota allocation released on January 20, 2014, Armenia has one athlete in qualification position. The final team was announced on January 21, 2014.

Cross-country skiing 

According to the quota allocation released on January 20, 2014, Armenia has three athletes in qualification position. The final team was announced on January 21, 2014.

See also
Armenia at the 2014 Summer Youth Olympics

References

External links 
 
 

Nations at the 2014 Winter Olympics
2014
2014 in Armenian sport